The Bowen River is a river in northern Fiordland, New Zealand. The river originates near Mount Grave and is joined by many small streams on its way south through the valley. The falls are named for Diamantina Bowen, wife of George Bowen, the fifth Governor of New Zealand.

As one of only two permanent waterfalls in Milford Sound, the falls provide electricity for the Milford Sound settlement by feeding a small hydroelectric scheme, and are also the water source for the settlement.

A track leading to the base of the falls was closed in 2003 due to rock falls and instability, but was partly re-opened in 2018 with the first section of the track now replaced by a short ride in a small boat from the Freshwater Basin Terminal in Milford.

See also
List of rivers of New Zealand

References

Rivers of Fiordland